William Douglas Houser (November 11, 1921 – February 5, 2012) was a United States Navy officer who later served as a telecommunications executive.

Naval career
Houser joined the United States Navy in 1941 and fought in World War II. His military career began aboard  in 1941. In 1944 the vessel was subject to a kamikaze attack that killed 131 people and injured many others.

After World War II, Houser became a Naval Aviator. He soon rose through the ranks to become operations officer and an executive officer of Fighter Squadron One-L. In the Korean War, Houser was assigned as commander of Fighter Squadron 44 and was awarded a Bronze Star Medal for his combat skills.

After Korea, Houser was with Air Development Squadron Three and later commanded Fighter Squadron 124, which was the navy's largest at the time. He also fought in the Vietnam War, serving in 1966 as commander of the Kitty Hawk-class aircraft carrier . His Vietnam service earned him the Legion of Merit.

Houser served as a member of the joint staff of the Joint Chiefs of Staff from 1960 to 1962 and again from 1967 to 1968. He was military assistant to the Secretary of Defense from 1962 to 1963, Director of Aviation Plans and Requirements of the United States Navy from 1968 to 1970, Commander of Carrier Division 2 of the United States Atlantic and Mediterranean Fleets from 1970 to 1972, and Deputy Chief of Naval Operations from 1972 to 1976.

In 1972 Houser was promoted to vice admiral. He retired from military service in 1976.

During Houser's time in non-combat positions he was responsible for keeping on the F-14 fighter aircraft, which was at risk of termination.

Telecommunications career
After his military service he pursued a career in the telecommunications industry. This began as director of satellite interconnection for the Corporation for Public Broadcasting from 1976 to 1979. He then moved on to serve as director of special projects of the Communications Satellite Corporation from 1979 to 1981 and Vice President from 1981 to 1984. He then went on to serve as President of Packet Tech (1984–1986), the Fort Scott Corporation (1986–1988), Interfax (1989–1991), and COM21 (1991–1994).
While at COMSAT in 1980 and working on a business plan for telecommunications satellite parks, Admiral Houser created the word "teleport."

Education
Houser received a Bachelor of Science from the United States Naval Academy in 1941, a Master of Science from George Washington University in 1963 and also studied at the University of Maryland, College of Special & Continuation Studies, the Naval War College, and Harvard University.

Organizations and clubs
Houser is a member of the Bohemian Club of San Francisco, California.

Death
Houser died on February 5, 2012.  He had suffered from Alzheimer's disease and pneumonia.

References

This article contains content from Hierarchypedia article William D. Houser, used here under the GNU Free Documentation License.

External links

navysite.de – USS Constellation (CV 64)

1921 births
2012 deaths
United States Navy admirals
United States Naval Academy alumni
United States Naval Aviators
United States Navy personnel of World War II
United States Navy personnel of the Korean War
United States Navy personnel of the Vietnam War
Recipients of the Legion of Merit
Deaths from Alzheimer's disease
Neurological disease deaths in Maryland
Deaths from pneumonia in Maryland
Harvard University alumni
George Washington University alumni
University of Maryland Global Campus alumni